Anthony Sims Jr. (born February 23, 1995) is an American professional boxer.

Personal life
Sims was born on February 23, 1995, in Plainfield, Indiana. He is a cousin of Floyd Mayweather Jr.

Professional career
Sims Jr. was a decorated US amateur and finished his amateur career with a record of 188-13, including 10 national titles.
 
The 6 ft 1 light heavyweight has demonstrated exceptional power and has knocked out all but two of his opponents. He has 10 first round KO's.

On August 1, 2018, he signed with promoter Eddie Hearn under Matchroom Boxing USA. Sims Jr. is now a free agent.

Professional boxing record

References

External links

 at Eddie Hearn Promotions

1995 births
Living people
American people of Cuban descent
Boxers from Indiana
African-American boxers
Super-middleweight boxers
21st-century African-American sportspeople